Peter John Lindsay  (born 4 May 1944) is a former Australian politician who served as a Liberal Party of Australia member of the Australian House of Representatives from March 1996 to July 2010, representing the Division of Herbert, Queensland. In January 2007 he was appointed to the position of Parliamentary Secretary to the Minister of Defence in the Howard Government. He was born in Brisbane, Queensland, and was a television station production manager and General Manager of Townsville Television from 1972 to 1996 before entering politics. He was a member of the City of Townsville City Council from 1985 to 1996.

In January 2010, Lindsay announced he would not contest the 2010 federal election. In 2011, Lindsay was appointed to the board of Origin Net and as the Chairman of Global Voices. In 2012, Lindsay was appointed as the Chairman of Guildford Coal. In 2014, Lindsay accepted the appointment of Deputy Chancellor James Cook University. Later in 2014, Lindsay was appointed to the boards of the Defence Honours & Awards Appeal Tribunal, the Queensland Government's Gambling Community Benefit Committee and the Constitution Education Fund Australia. In 2016, Peter was awarded the medal of the Order of Australia.

References

External links

Peter Lindsay's personal homepage
Official Parliamentary Biography

1944 births
Living people
Liberal Party of Australia members of the Parliament of Australia
Members of the Australian House of Representatives
Members of the Australian House of Representatives for Herbert
Recipients of the Medal of the Order of Australia
People from Townsville
21st-century Australian politicians
20th-century Australian politicians